The Savannah Civic Center is a multi-purpose facility located in Savannah, Georgia, in Savannah Historic District. Built-in 1974, the facility consists of an arena, theatre, ballroom, and exhibit halls.  Throughout the years, the center hosts various concerts, conventions, exhibits, high school and college graduations, trade shows, theatre, ballet, and comedy shows. The venue offers event planning, a national A/V company, and production management. The center has held concerts by many famous artists from around the world.

Each year, the civic center hosts nearly 900 events including the Savannah Tire Hockey Classic, which awards the "Thrasher Cup" and numerous meetings are held in the building's meeting wings. It was the home to the Savannah Bees basketball team, the Continental Basketball Association's Savannah Spirits basketball team, and the Savannah Rug Ratz soccer team of the EISL. The arena between the years of 1986-87 was the host of the  Big South Conference's men's basketball tournament.

New arena

In 2017, the City Council voted to build a new area, west of downtown. The aging MLK Jr Arena proved to be too small to attract bigger acts and the repairs needed to bring the facility up to code were too costly. Initial plans saw the removal of the arena solely. In June 2019, the council voted to demolish the entire civic center to create more green space in accordance with "The Oglethorpe Plan." Destruction of the center and renovation of the lot will take at least four years, based on the timeline recommended by the Urban Land Atlanta Institute. A campaign to "Save the Mercer" theater inside the Civic Center has been initiated by a longtime Savannah resident, Paul Mazo. Mazo told a local TV station that city officials indicated a preservation campaign will "open the door to some [needed] community discussion."

The new arena, originally known as Savannah Arena and subsequently renamed Enmarket Arena after securing a naming rights agreement in July 2021, opened in the first half of 2022. The estimated cost of the project is $165 million. Perkins + Will have been named the firm in charge of designing the arena, while AECOM Hunt is in charge of construction. City Council has stated there are no plans to demolish the Civic Center until three to five years after the new arena is built.

Facilities

Noted performers
Several noted musicians have performed at the venue, including:

Aerosmith
Alice Cooper
Alabama
The Allman Brothers Band
The B-52's
Barry Manilow
Beastie Boys
The Black Crowes
Bobby Brown
Bob Dylan
Boyz II Men
Brad Paisley
Blues Traveler
Carrie Underwood
Chicago
Default
Def Leppard
Dionne Warwick
Elton John
Elvis Presley
Filter
The Jackson 5
Jimmy Buffett and the Coral Reefer Band
John Cougar Mellencamp
Journey
Kid Rock
Kiss
Lynyrd Skynyrd
Mary J. Blige
Merle Haggard
Miranda Lambert
Nickelback
Pete Yorn
Puddle of Mudd
R.E.M.
Ray Charles
Reba McEntire
REO Speedwagon
Rick James
Rob Zombie
Run-DMC
Saliva
Styx
Van Halen
White Zombie
Willie Nelson
ZZ Top

References

Civic Center
Basketball venues in Georgia (U.S. state)
College basketball venues in the United States
Concert halls in the United States
Indoor soccer venues in the United States
Theatres in Georgia (U.S. state)
Continental Basketball Association venues
Indoor arenas in Georgia (U.S. state)
Music venues in Georgia (U.S. state)
Music venues completed in 1974
Sports venues completed in 1974
Theatres completed in 1974